Jerry Dixon may refer to:

 Jerry Dixon (musician), American musician
 Jerry Dixon (actor), American actor, director, choreographer and composer